Jiang Guang-nan (born 30 July 1948) is a former Taiwanese cyclist. He competed in team time trial at the 1968 Summer Olympics.

References

1948 births
Living people
Taiwanese male cyclists
Olympic cyclists of Taiwan
Cyclists at the 1968 Summer Olympics